Clemente López de Osornio (1720–1783) was a Spanish military leader. He served during the Viceroyalty of Peru as Captain of the Regiment of Blandengues of Buenos Aires.

Biography
He was baptized on November 25, 1720, in Buenos Aires, son of Francisco López Osornio and María Gamiz de las Cuevas Álvarez Lasarte, a family of Creole origin, born in the city.

In 1736 Clemente López de Osornio enlisted in the provincial militia of cavalry and served in the defense in the fort of Arrecifes against Indians. Three years later, he participated in the campaign of Captain Juan de San Martín to the area that is now Laguna de los Padres, near Mar del Plata.

In 1752 Osornio was appointed Commissioner in the pago of Magdalena. And in 1765 he served as Commanding general of militia in Province of Buenos Aires, where he led an expedition to the Salinas Grandes, west of Bahia Blanca, along the way, he made a census of the tribes that roamed the area, and organized five companies of Blandengues of cavalry intended to garrison the southern border against the Indians.

In 1766 Clemente López Osornio was appointed Alcalde de la hermandad in Magdalena, which covered large areas of land, including Avellaneda, Quilmes, Lomas de Zamora and the present territory of Almirante Brown.

In 1767 López de Osornio led a military expedition against the Guaraní tribes. Years later in 1775 he participated of an expedition in Cairú (Tandil) and lagoon Blanca Grande (Olavarría) against the Pampas tribes.

López Osornio retired from the army in 1779, dedicating itself since then to the administration of his stay named Rincón de López in Chascomús (Buenos Aires Province). He became a wealthy landowner. In 1782 he was appointed as representative of the landowners in the Cabildo porteño.

Family and death 
López Osornio was married in Buenos Aires on October 9, 1746, to Martina Arroyo Jiménez de Paz, daughter of Tomás de Arroyo Palacios and Ignacia Jiménez de Paz Parejas. They had four children: Catalina, Andres Ramón, María Magdalena and Angel López de Osornio.

After his wife died, he was remarried in the Buenos Aires Cathedral on February 25, 1766, to María Manuela Rubio Díaz Gamiz. She was from a distinguished family, being the daughter of Juan José Rubio and Isabel Díaz Gamiz. They had six children: Juana Bautista, María Rafaela, Petrona Josefa, Agustina, José Silverio and María Luisa López de Osornio.

On December 13, 1783, Clemente López de Osornio, his son Andrés, his pawns and slaves were killed by an incursion of the Pampas tribes against his ranch, El Rincón de López, located in Chascomús, Buenos Aires Province.

He was the maternal grandfather of Juan Manuel de Rosas, a distinguished caudillo, who was Governor of Buenos Aires in uninterrupted form from March 7, 1835, to February 3, 1852.

References

External links
www.lagazeta.com.ar

1720 births
1783 deaths
People from Buenos Aires
Conquest of the Desert
Spanish military personnel
Spanish colonial governors and administrators